B.O.X ~Best of X~ is a compilation box set released by X Japan on March 21, 1996. It contains two CDs, a VHS tape and a T-shirt from the "Violence and Jealousy Tour". The album reached number 5 on the Oricon chart. It was re-released on December 1, 1996 in a different case without any extras and without the last three tracks on disc one.

Track listing 
Disc one
 "Silent Jealousy" (Live 1992.01.07) – 6:30
 "Desperate Angel" – 5:53
 "Kurenai" (Live 1989.06.10) – 5:45
 "Week End" (Live 1992.01.07) – 5:53
 "Endless Rain" – 6:36
 "Celebration" – 4:52
 "Joker" (Live 1992.01.07) – 5:18
 "Sadistic Desire" (New Version) – 6:01
 "X" – 6:01
 "Say Anything" – 8:42
 "I'll Kill You" – 3:29
 "Kurenai" (English Version) – 6:19
 "Unfinished" – 1:32

Disc two (instrumental versions)
 "Silent Jealousy" – 7:20
 "Desperate Angel" – 5:44
 "Kurenai" – 5:47
 "Week End" – 5:49
 "Endless Rain" – 6:32
 "Celebration" – 4:48
 "Joker" – 4:41
 "Sadistic Desire" – 5:59
 "X" – 5:59
 "Say Anything" – 8:40

References 

1996 greatest hits albums
X Japan compilation albums